The Class D52 is a type of 2-8-2 steam locomotive built by the Japanese Government Railways (Now Japanese National Railways) and various manufacturers: Kisha Seizo, Nippon Sharyo, Kawasaki Heavy Industries Rolling Stock Company, Hitachi, and Mitsubishi Heavy Industries from 1943 to 1946. The name consists of a "D" for the four sets of driving wheels and the class number 52 for tender locomotives that the numbers 50 through 99 were assigned to under the 1928 locomotive classification rule.

Preserved examples
Most of the D52s have been scrapped. However, seven locomotives have been preserved.

 D52 1, at JR Freight Hiroshima Depot
 D52 70 is semi-operational and runs on a short line, on compressed air, at a park in Yamakita, Kanagawa.
 D52 72, in Gotemba, Shizuoka
 D52 136, in Numazu, Shizuoka
 D52 235, in Kanuma Park, Sagamihara, Kanagawa
 D52 403, in Hiratsuka, Kanagawa
 D52 468, at the Kyoto Railway Museum, Kyoto

See also
 Japan Railways locomotive numbering and classification 
JNR Class 9600
JNR Class D50
JNR Class D51

References

External links

1067 mm gauge locomotives of Japan
Steam locomotives of Japan
2-8-2 locomotives
Hitachi locomotives
Kawasaki locomotives
Preserved steam locomotives of Japan
Railway locomotives introduced in 1943
Freight locomotives